Salem Wales Goodale (September 16, 1871 – August 22, 1931) was an American football coach.  He was the head football coach at Baker University in Baldwin City, Kansas, serving from 1890 to 1891, and compiling a record of 6–2–1.

Goodale was the first victorious head college football coach in Kansas. He was the head coach at Baker for the first college football game played in the state of Kansas. On November 22, 1890, his team beat the Kansas Jayhawks by a score of 22–9.

References

External links
 

1871 births
1931 deaths
Baker Wildcats football coaches
Lake Forest College alumni
Sportspeople from Marshalltown, Iowa